Malekshah may refer to:
Malekshahi dialect, see Southern Kurdish
Malekshahi, Kermanshah
Malekshahi County, in Ilam Province